The Mandinka or Malinke are a West African ethnic group primarily found in southern Mali, the Gambia and eastern Guinea. Numbering about 11 million, they are the largest subgroup of the Mandé peoples and one of the largest ethnic-linguistic groups in Africa. They speak the Manding languages in the Mande language family and a lingua franca in much of West Africa. Over 99% of Mandinka adhere to Islam. They are predominantly subsistence farmers and live in rural villages. Their largest urban center is Bamako, the capital of Mali.

The Mandinka are the descendants of the Mali Empire, which rose to power in the 13th century under the rule of king Sundiata Keita, who founded an empire that would go on to span a large part of West Africa. They migrated west from the Niger River in search of better agricultural lands and more opportunities for conquest. Nowadays, the Mandinka inhabit the West Sudanian savanna region extending from The Gambia and the Casamance region in Senegal,Burkina Faso and Ivory Coast. Although widespread, the Mandinka constitute the largest ethnic group only in the countries of Mali, Guinea and The Gambia. Most Mandinka live in family-related compounds in traditional rural villages. Their traditional society has featured socially stratified castes. Mandinka communities have been fairly autonomous and self-ruled, being led by a chief and group of elders. Mandinka has been an oral society, where mythologies, history and knowledge are verbally transmitted from one generation to the next. Their music and literary traditions are preserved by a caste of griots, known locally as jelis, as well as guilds and brotherhoods like the donso (hunters).

Between the 16th and 19th centuries, many Muslim and non-Muslim Mandinka people, along with numerous other African ethnic groups, were captured, enslaved and shipped to the Americas. They intermixed with slaves and workers of other ethnicities, creating a Creole culture. The Mandinka people significantly influenced the African heritage of descended peoples now found in Brazil, the Southern United States and, to a lesser extent, the Caribbean.

History

The history of Mandinka people started in the Manden (or Manding or Mandé) region, what is now southern Mali. Hunters from the Ghana Empire (or Wagadou) founded the Mandinka country in Manden. The mythical origin of the Malinké and the Bambara people are their mythical ancestors, Kontron and Sanin, the founding "hunter brotherhood". The country was famous for the large number of animals and game that it sheltered, as well as its dense vegetation, so was a very popular hunting ground. The Camara (or Kamara) are believed to be the oldest family to have lived in Manden, after having left Ouallata, a region of Wagadou, in the south-east of present-day Mauritania, due to drought. They founded the first village of Manding, Kirikoroni, then Kirina, Siby, Kita. A very large number of families that make up the Mandinka community were born in Manden. Manding is the province from which the Mali Empire started, under the leadership of Sundiata Keita. The Manden were initially a part of many fragmented kingdoms that formed after the collapse of Ghana empire in the 11th century. During the rule of Sundiata Keita, these kingdoms were consolidated, and the Mandinka expanded west from the Niger River basin under Sundiata's general Tiramakhan Traore. This expansion was a part of creating a region of conquest, according to the oral tradition of the Mandinka people. This migration began in the later part of the 13th century.

Another group of Mandinka people, under Faran Kamara – the son of the king of Tabou – expanded southeast of Mali, while a third group expanded with Fakoli Kourouma.

With the migration, many gold artisans and metal working Mandinka smiths settled along the coast and in the hilly Fouta Djallon and plateau areas of West Africa. Their presence and products attracted Mandika merchants and brought trading caravans from north Africa and the eastern Sahel, states Toby Green – a professor of African History and Culture. It also brought conflicts with other ethnic groups, such as the Wolof people, particularly the Jolof Empire.

The caravan trade to North Africa and Middle East brought Islamic people into Mandinka people's original and expanded home region. The Muslim traders sought presence in the host Mandinka community, and this likely initiated proselytizing efforts to convert the Mandinka from their traditional religious beliefs into Islam. In Ghana, for example, the Almoravids had divided its capital into two parts by 1077, one part was Muslim and the other non-Muslim. The Muslim influence from North Africa had arrived in the Mandinka region before this, via Islamic trading diasporas.

In 1324, Mansa Musa who ruled Mali, went on Hajj pilgrimage to Mecca with a caravan carrying gold. Shihab al-Umari, the Arabic historian, described his visit and stated that Musa built mosques in his kingdom, established Islamic prayers and took back Maliki school of Sunni jurists with him. According to Richard Turner – a professor of African American Religious History, Musa was highly influential in attracting North African and Middle Eastern Muslims to West Africa.

The Mandinka people of Mali converted early, but those who migrated to the west did not convert and retained their traditional religious rites. One of the legends among the Mandingo of western Africa is that the general Tiramakhan Traore led the migration, because people in Mali had converted to Islam and he did not want to. Another legend gives a contrasting account, and states that Traore himself had converted and married Muhammad's granddaughter. The Traore's marriage with a Muhammad's granddaughter, states Toby Green, is fanciful, but these conflicting oral histories suggest that Islam had arrived well before the 13th century and had a complex interaction with the Mandinka people.

Through a series of conflicts, primarily with the Fula-led jihads under Imamate of Futa Jallon, many Mandinka converted to Islam. In contemporary West Africa, the Mandinka are predominantly Muslim, with a few regions where significant portions of the population are not Muslim, such as Guinea Bissau, where 35 percent of the Mandinka practice Islam, more than 20 percent are Christian, and 15 percent follow traditional beliefs.

Slavery
Slave raiding, capture and trading in the Mandinka regions may have existed in significant numbers before the European colonial era, as is evidenced in the memoirs of the 14th century Moroccan traveller and Islamic historian Ibn Battuta. Slaves were part of the socially stratified Mandinka people, and several Mandinka language words, such as Jong or Jongo refer to slaves. There were fourteen Mandinke kingdoms along the Gambia River in the Senegambia region during the early 19th century, for example, where slaves were a part of the social strata in all these kingdoms.

According to Toby Green, selling slaves along with gold was already a significant part of the trans-Saharan caravan trade across the Sahel between West Africa and the Middle East after the 13th century. With the arrival of Portuguese explorers in Africa as they looked for a sea route to India, the European purchase of slaves had begun. The shipment of slaves by the Portuguese, primarily from the Jolof people, along with some Mandinka, started in the 15th century, states Green, but the earliest evidence of a trade involving Mandinka slaves is from and after 1497 CE. In parallel with the start of the trans-Atlantic slave trade, the institution of slavery and slave-trading of West Africans into the Mediterranean region and inside Africa continued as a historic normal practice.

Slavery grew significantly between the 16th and 19th century. The Portuguese considered slave sources in Guinea and Senegambia parts of Mandinka territory as belonging to them, with their 16th to 18th century slave trade-related documents referring to "our Guinea" and complaining about slave traders from other European nations superseding them in the slave trade. Their slave exports from this region nearly doubled in the second half of the 18th century compared to the first, but most of these slaves disembarked in Brazil.

Scholars have offered several theories on the source of the transatlantic slave trade of Mandinka people. According to Boubacar Barry, a professor of History and African Studies, chronic violence between ethnic groups such as Mandinka people and their neighbours, combined with weapons sold by slave traders and lucrative income from slave ships to the slave sellers, fed the practice of captives, raiding, manhunts, and slaves. The victimised ethnic group felt justified in retaliating. Slavery was already an accepted practice before the 15th century. As the demand grew, states Barry, Futa Jallon led by an Islamic military theocracy became one of the centers of this slavery-perpetuating violence, while Farim of Kaabu (the commander of Mandinka people in Kaabu) energetically hunted slaves on a large scale. Martin Klein (a professor of African Studies) states that Kaabu was one of the early suppliers of African slaves to European merchants.

The historian Walter Rodney states that Mandinka and other ethnic groups already had slaves who inherited slavery by birth, and who could be sold. The Islamic armies from Sudan had long established the practice of slave raids and trade. Fula jihad from Futa Jallon plateau perpetuated and expanded this practice. These jihads were the largest producer of slaves for the Portuguese traders at the ports controlled by Mandinka people. The insecure ethnic groups, states Rodney, stopped working productively and became withdrawn, which made social and economic conditions desperate, and they also joined the retaliatory cycle of slave raids and violence.

Walter Hawthorne (a professor of African History) states that the Barry and Rodney explanation was not universally true for all of Senegambia and Guinea where high concentrations of Mandinka people have traditionally lived. Hawthorne states that large numbers of Mandinka people started arriving as slaves in various European colonies in North America, South America and the Caribbean only between mid 18th through to the 19th century. During these years, slave trade records show that nearly 33% of the slaves from Senegambia and Guinea-Bissau coasts were Mandinka people. Hawthorne suggests three causes of Mandinka people appearing as slaves during this era: small-scale jihads by Muslims against non-Muslim Mandinka, non-religious reasons such as economic greed of Islamic elites who wanted imports from the coast, and attacks by the Fula people on Mandinka's Kaabu with consequent cycle of violence.

Wassoulou Empire

Economy

Mandinka are rural subsistence farmers who rely on peanuts, rice, millet, maize, and small-scale husbandry for their livelihood. During the wet season, men plant peanuts as their main cash crop. Men also grow millet and women grow rice (traditionally, African rice), tending the plants by hand.
This is extremely labour-intensive and physically demanding work. Only about 50% of the rice consumption needs are met by local planting; the rest is imported from Asia and the United States.

The oldest male is the head of the family and marriages are commonly arranged. Small mud houses with conical thatch or tin roofs make up their villages, which are organised on the basis of the clan groups. While farming is the predominant profession among the Mandinka, men also work as tailors, butchers, taxi drivers, woodworkers, metalworkers, soldiers, nurses, and extension workers for aid agencies. However, most women, probably 95%, tend to the home, children, and animals as well as work alongside the men in the fields.

Religion
Today, most people of Mandinka practice Islam. Mandinkas recite chapters of the Qur'an in Arabic. Some Mandinka syncretise Islam and traditional African religions. Among these syncretists spirits can be controlled mainly through the power of a marabout, who knows the protective formulas. In most cases, no important decision is made without first consulting a marabout. Marabouts, who have Islamic training, write Qur'anic verses on slips of paper and sew them into leather pouches (talisman); these are worn as protective amulets.

The conversion to Islam took place over many centuries. According to Robert Wyndham Nicholls, Mandinka in Senegambia started converting to Islam as early as the 17th century, and most of Mandinka leatherworkers there converted to Islam before the 19th century. The Mandinka musicians, however were last, converting to Islam mostly in the first half of the 20th century. Like elsewhere, these Muslims have continued their pre-Islamic religious practices such as their annual rain ceremony and "sacrifice of the black bull" to their past deities.

Society and culture

Most Mandinkas live in family-related compounds in traditional rural villages. Mandinka villages are fairly autonomous and self-ruled, being led by a council of upper class elders and a chief who functions as a first among equals.

Social stratification
The Mandinka people have traditionally been a socially stratified society, like many West African ethnic groups with castes. The Mandinka society, states Arnold Hughes – a professor of West African Studies and African Politics, has been "divided into three endogamous castes – the freeborn (foro), slaves (jongo), and artisans and praise singers (nyamolo). The freeborn castes are primarily farmers, while the slave strata included labor providers to the farmers, as well as leather workers, pottery makers, metal smiths, griots, and others. The Mandinka Muslim clerics and scribes have traditionally been considered as a separate occupational caste called Jakhanke, with their Islamic roots traceable to about the 13th century.

The Mandinka castes are hereditary, and marriages outside the caste was forbidden. Their caste system is similar to those of other ethnic groups of the African Sahel region, and found across the Mandinka communities such as those in Gambia, Mali, Guinea and other countries.

Rites of passage
The Mandinka practice a rite of passage, kuyangwoo, which marks the beginning of adulthood for their children. At an age between four and fourteen, the youngsters have their genitalia ritually cut (see articles on male and female genital cutting), in separate groups according to their sex. In years past, the children spent up to a year in the bush, but that has been reduced now to coincide with their physical healing time, between three and four weeks.

During this time, they learn about their adult social responsibilities and rules of behaviour. Preparation is made in the village or compound for the return of the children. A celebration marks the return of these new adults to their families. As a result of these traditional teachings, in marriage a woman's loyalty remains to her parents and her family; a man's to his.

Female genital mutilation
The women among the Mandinka people, like other ethnic groups near them, have traditionally practiced female genital mutilation (FGM), traditionally referred to as "female circumcision." According to UNICEF, the female genital mutilation prevalence rates among the Mandinkas of the Gambia is the highest at over 96%, followed by FGM among the women of the Jola people's at 91% and Fula people at 88%. Among the Mandinka women of some other countries of West Africa, the FGM prevalence rates are lower, but range between 40% to 90%. This cultural practice, locally called Niaka or Kuyungo or Musolula Karoola or Bondo, involves the partial or total removal of the clitoris, or alternatively, the partial or total removal of the labia minora with the clitoris.

Some surveys, such as those by the Gambia Committee on Traditional Practices (GAMCOTRAP), estimate FGM is prevalent among 100% of the Mandinkas in Gambia. In 2010, after community efforts of UNICEF and the local government bodies, several Mandinka women's organization pledged to abandon the female genital mutilation practices.

Marriage
Marriages are traditionally arranged by family members rather than either the bride or groom. This practice is particularly prevalent in the rural areas. Kola nuts, a bitter nut from a tree, are formally sent by the suitor's family to the male elders of the bride-to-be, and if accepted, the courtship begins.

Polygamy has been practiced among the Mandinka since pre-Islamic days. A Mandinka man is legally allowed to have up to four wives, as long as he is able to care for each of them equally. Mandinka believe the crowning glory of any woman is the ability to produce children, especially sons. The first wife has authority over any subsequent wives. The husband has complete control over his wives and is responsible for feeding and clothing them. He also helps the wives' parents when necessary. Wives are expected to live together in harmony, at least superficially. They share work responsibilities of the compound, such as cooking, laundry, and other tasks.

Music

Mandinka culture is rich in tradition, music, and spiritual ritual. Mandinkas continue a long oral history tradition through stories, songs, and proverbs. In rural areas, western education's impact is minimal; the literacy rate in Latin script among these Mandinka is quite low. However, more than half the adult population can read the local Arabic script (including Mandinka Ajami); small Qur'anic schools for children where this is taught are quite common. Mandinka children are given their name on the eighth day after their birth, and their children are almost always named after a very important person in their family.

The Mandinka have a rich oral history that is passed down through griots. This passing down of oral history through music has made music one of the most distinctive traits of the Mandinka. They have long been known for their drumming and also for their unique musical instrument, the kora. The kora is a twenty-one-stringed West-African harp made out of a halved, dried, hollowed-out gourd covered with cow or goat skin. The strings are made of fishing line (these were traditionally made from a cow's tendons). It is played to accompany a griot's singing or simply on its own.

A Mandinka religious and cultural site under consideration for World Heritage status is located in Guinea at Gberedou/Hamana.

The kora
The kora has become the hallmark of traditional Mandinka musicians". The kora with its 21 strings is made from half a calabash, covered with cow's hide fastened on by decorative tacks. The kora has sound holes in the side which are used to store coins offered to the praise singers, in appreciation of their performance. The praise singers are called "jalibaas" or "jalis" in Mandinka.

In literature and other media
One Mandinka outside Africa is Kunta Kinte, a main figure in Alex Haley's book Roots and a subsequent TV mini-series. Haley claimed he was descended from Kinte, though this familial link has been criticised by many professional historians and at least one genealogist as highly improbable (see D. Wright's The World And A Very Small Place). Martin R. Delany, a 19th century abolitionist, military leader, politician and physician in the United States, was of partial Mandinka descent.

Sinéad O'Connor's 1988 hit "Mandinka" was inspired by Alex Haley's book.

Mr. T, of American television fame, once claimed that his distinctive hairstyle was modelled after a Mandinka warrior that he saw in National Geographic magazine. In his motivational video Be Somebody... or Be Somebody's Fool!, he states: "My folks came from Africa. They were from the Mandinka tribe. They wore their hair like this. These gold chains I wear symbolize the fact that my ancestors were brought over here as slaves." In a 2006 interview, he reiterated that he modeled his hair style after photographs of Mandinka men he saw in National Geographic.

Many early works by Malian author Massa Makan Diabaté are retellings of Mandinka legends, including Janjon, which won the 1971 Grand prix littéraire d'Afrique noire. His novels The Lieutenant of Kouta, The Barber of Kouta and The Butcher of Kouta attempt to capture the proverbs and customs of the Mandinka people in novelistic form.

Notable people by country

Burkina Faso

 Joffrey Bazié, Burkinabé footballer
 Amadou Coulibaly, Burkinabé footballer
 Yaya Darlaine Coulibaly
 Joseph Ki-Zerbo, political leader and historian
 Bakary Koné, Burkinabé footballer
 Cheick Kongo, Burkinabé mixed martial artist
 General Sangoulé Lamizana, former President 1966–1980
 Oumarou Nébié
 Colonel Saye Zerbo, former President 1980–1982

The Gambia

 Adama Barrow, politician; third president of the Gambia 
 Jatto Ceesay, footballer 
 Ousainou Darboe, Foreign Minister of the Gambia 
 Sheriff Mustapha Dibba, veteran politician and the First vice President of the Gambia
 Abdoulie Janneh, former UN Under-Secretary General
 Sidia Jatta, opposition politician
 Alhajj Sir Dawda Kairaba Jawara, first President of the Gambia
 Sona Jobarteh, first female kora artist (musician)
 Jaliba Kuyateh, kora artist and celebrated musician in the Mandinka language
 Kekuta Manneh
 Professor Lamin O. Sanneh, academician and author 
 Abdoulie Sanyang
 Amadou Sanyang
 Ebrima Sohna
 Foday Musa Suso, international musician.

Guinea

 Sekouba Bambino, Guinean musician

 Aguibou Camara
 Ibrahima Cissé
 Alpha Condé, Guinean President ; first elected 2010, reelected 2015 and 2020
 Mamady Condé, Guinean foreign minister from 2004 to 2007
 Sékou Condé, Guinean footballer
 Sona Tata Condé, Guinean musician

 Amadou Diawara
 Djeli Moussa Diawara, Guinean musician (also known as Jali Musa Jawara - 32-stringed Kora player)
 Kaba Diawara, Guinean footballer
 Mamady Doumbouya, Guinean military officer 

 Daouda Jabi, Guinean footballer

 Mamadi Kaba, Guinean footballer
 Sory Kaba, Guinean footballer
 Mory Kanté, Guinean kora musician
 Alhassane Keita, Guinean footballer
 Mamady Keïta, Guinean musician
 Naby Keita, Guinean footballer
 Kabiné Komara, former Prime Minister of Guinea
 Famoudou Konaté, Guinean musician
 General Sékouba Konaté, former Head of State of Guinea
 Lansana Kouyaté, former prime minister of Guinea
 N'Faly Kouyate, Guinean musician

 Fodé Mansaré, Guinean footballer

 Petit Sory, Guinean footballer

 Sekou Touré, President of Guinea from 1958 to 1984; was also the grandson of Samory Touré
 Diarra Traoré, former Prime Minister of Guinea
 Samori Ture, founder of the Wassoulou Empire, an Islamic military state that resisted French rule in West Africa

 Mohamed Yattara

Guinea Bissau

 Yalany Baio, Bissau-Guinean footballer
 Mimito Biai, Bissau-Guinean footballer
 Sana Canté, Bissau-Guinean activist
 Rui Dabó, Bissau-Guinean footballer
 Tomás Dabó, Bissau-Guinean footballer
 João Jaquité, Bissau-Guinean footballer
 Jorginho
 Moía Mané, Bissau-Guinean footballer
 Sori Mané, Bissau-Guinean footballer
 Madi Queta, Bissau-Guinean footballer
 Neemias Queta, Bissau-Guinean basketball player
 Alfa Semedo
 Romário Baró

Ivory Coast

 Sidiki Bakaba, Ivorian actor and filmmaker
 Alpha Blondy, Ivorian (reggae) musician
 Ibrahim Cissé, Ivorian footballer
 Sekou Cissé, Ivorian footballer
 Fousseny Coulibaly, footballer
 Kafoumba Coulibaly, footballer
 Siriki Dembélé, Ivorian footballer
 Henriette Diabaté, former Ivorian politician
 Sinaly Diomande, footballer
 Emmanuel Eboué, footballer
 Tiken Jah Fakoly, Ivorian (reggae) musician
 Hassane Kamara, Ivorian Footballer
 Abdul Kader Keïta, Ivorian footballer
 Arouna Koné, Ivorian footballer
 Ahmadou Kourouma, Ivorian writer
 Bakari Koné, Ivorian footballer
 Tiassé Koné, Ivorian footballer
 Alassane Ouattara, Côte d'Ivoire president ; Prime Minister of Côte d'Ivoire, 1990 -  1993
 Guillaume Soro, Ivorian politician
 Karim Konaté, Footballer
 Kolo Touré, Ivorian footballer
 Sékou Touré Ivorian politician, environmental engineer, former UN Executive
 Yaya Touré, Ivorian footballer
 Marco Zoro, footballer

Liberia

 Momolu Dukuly, former Liberian Foreign Minister
 Abu Kamara
 Amara Mohamed Konneh, Minister of Finance
 G. V. Kromah, member of the defunct Liberian Council of State
 Alex Nimely
 Sylvanus Nimely
 Ansu Toure

Mali

 Soumaila Coulibaly, Malian footballer

 Bako Dagnon, Malian female griot singer
 Cheick Diabaté, Malian footballer
 Massa Makan Diabaté, Malian historian, writer and playwright
 Mamadou Diabate, Malian musician
 Toumani Diabaté, Malian musician
 Yoro Diakité, former Malian Prime Minister
 Fatoumata Diawara, Malian musician
 Fousseni Diawara, Malian footballer
 Daba Diawara, Malian politician

 Aoua Kéita, Malian politician and activist
 Ibrahim Boubacar Keïta, President of Mali, September 2013 - August 2020
 Habib Keïta
 Modibo Keïta, President of Mali from 1960 to 1968
 Salif Keita, Malian musician
 Seydou Keita, Malian footballer
 Sundiata Keita, founder of the Mali Empire
 Amy Koita, Malian musician
 Ibrahima Konaté
 Pa Konate
 Makan Konaté
 Moussa Kouyate, Malian musician

 Mansa Musa, (c. 1280 – c. 1337), the ninth, especially renowned, Mansa (emperor) of the Mali Empire

 Oumou Sangaré, Malian musician
 Djibril Sidibé, Malian footballer
 Mamady Sidibé, Malian footballer
 Modibo Sidibé, Prime Minister of Mali, 2007 - 2011
 Baba Sissoko, Malian musician
 Mohamed Sissoko, Malian footballer

 Almamy Touré
 Amadou Toumani Touré, President of Mali from 2002 to 2012

Senegal

 Brancou Badio
 Dawda Camara
 Keita Baldé, Senegalese footballer
 Papa Demba Camara, Senegalese footballer
 Aliou Cissé, former Senegalese footballer
 Pape Abou Cissé

 Papiss Demba Cissé, Senegalese footballer
 Krépin Diatta, Senegalese footballer
 Souleymane Diawara, Senegalese footballer
 Boukary Dramé, Senegalese footballer
 Lamine Gassama, Senegalese footballer
 Sidiki Kaba, Justice Minister of Senegal
 General Balla Keita, MiNUSCA Force Commander
 Seckou Keita, Senegalese musician
 Moussa Konaté, Senegalese footballer
 Cheikhou Kouyaté, Senegalese footballer
 Sadio Mané, Senegalese footballer
 Moustapha Mbow
 Opa Nguette, Senegalese footballer
 Amadou Onana
 Ludovic Lamine Sané, Senegalese footballer
 Boubakary Soumaré
 Amara Traoré, former Senegalese footballer
 Aminata Touré, former Prime Minister of Senegal
 Zargo Touré, Senegalese footballer

Sierra Leone

 Amadou Bakayoko
 Ibrahim Jaffa Condeh, Sierra Leonean journalist and news anchor

 Fode Dabo, former Sierra Leone Ambassador to Belgium, France, Netherlands, Luxemburg and Italy and former High Commissioner to the Gambia.
 Kanji Daramy, journalist and spokesman for former Sierra Leone's president Ahmad Tejan Kabbah. He is also the former Chairman of Sierra Leone National Telecommunications Commission
 Mabinty Daramy, current Sierra Leone's Deputy Minister of Trade and Industry
 Mohamed B. Daramy, former minister of Development and Economic Planning from 2002 to 2007, former ECOWAS Commissioner of Income Tax

 Kemoh Fadika, current Sierra Leone's High Commissioner to the Gambia and former High Commissioner to Nigeria, former Ambassador to Egypt and Iran.
 Lansana Fadika, Sierra Leonean businessman and former SLPP chairman for the Western Area. He is the younger brother of Kemoh Fadika

 Bomba Jawara, former MP of Sierra Leone from Koinadugu District (SLPP)

 Ahmad Tejan Kabbah, President of Sierra Leone from 1996 to 2007
 Haja Afsatu Kabba, former Sierra Leone's Minister of Marine Resources and Fisheries; Energy and Power; Lands
 Karamoh Kabba, Sierra Leonean author, writer and journalist
 Mohamed Kakay, former MP of Sierra Leone from Koinadugu District (SLPP)
 Alhaji Kamara
 Kadijatu Kebbay, Sierra Leonean model; Miss University Sierra Leone 2006 winner and represent Sierra Leone at the Miss World 2006 contest
 Brima Keita, Sierra Leonean football manager
 Brima Dawson Kuyateh, journalist and the current president of the Sierra Leone Reporters Union

 Sidique Mansaray, Sierra Leonean footballer
 Tejan Amadu Mansaray, former MP of Sierra Leone representing Koinadugu District (APC)

 Shekuba Saccoh, former Sierra Leone's ambassador to Guinea and former Minister of Social Welfare
 K-Man (born Mohamed Saccoh), Sierra Leonean musician
 Alhaji A. B. Sheriff, former MP from Koinadugu District (SLPP)

 Sheka Tarawalie, Sierra Leonean journalist and former State House Press Secretary to president Koroma. Former Deputy Minister of Information and current Deputy Minister of Internal Affairs.
 Sitta Umaru Turay, Sierra Leonean journalist

Togo

 Mohamed Kader Toure

United States

 Mo Bamba, professional basketball player 
 Martin Delany, abolitionist, journalist, physician and writer (had two Mandinka grandparents brought to America as slaves)
 Alex Haley, writer, author of the 1976 book Roots: The Saga of an American Family
 Kunta Kinte, documented captured Mandinka warrior during the last years of the Atlantic slave trade. He is Alex Haley's ancestor and the key character in Haley's book Roots, and is also portrayed in the record-breaking TV miniseries Roots.
 Gabourey Sidibe, actress
 Foday Musa Suso, griot musician and composer
 Sheck Wes, rapper and professional basketball player.

See also
 Djembe
 Gravikord
 Mande languages
 Mandingo people of Sierra Leone
 Mane people
 N'Ko alphabet

Notes

References

Further reading

 Lucie Gallistel Colvin. Historical Dictionary of Senegal. Scarecrow Press/ Metuchen. NJ - Kondon (1981), pp. 216–217
 Pascal James Imperato. Historical Dictionary of Mali. Scarecrow Press/ Metuchen. NJ - Kondon (1986), pp. 190–191
 Robert J. Mundt. Historical Dictionary of the Ivory Coast (Côte d'Ivoire). Scarecrow Press/ Metuchen. NJ - Kondon (1987), pp. 98–99
 Robert W. Nicholls. "The Mocko Jumbie of the U.S. Virgin Islands; History and Antecedents". African Arts, Vol. 32, No. 3 (Autumn 1999), pp. 48–61, 94–96
 Matt Schaffer (editor). "Djinns, Stars and Warriors: Mandinka Legends from Pakao, Senegal" (African Sources for African History, 5), Brill Academic Publishers (2003). 
 
 ETHNOLOGUE Languages of the World- Thirteenth Edition (1996).
Pauls, Elizabeth Prine (February 2007). "Malinke people". In: Editors of Encyclopaedia Britannica, (online) Encyclopaedia Britannica.

External links
 Mandinka
 Malinke

 A UK based website devoted to playing Malinke djembe rhythms
 The Ethnologue page for this people group
 

 
Ethnic groups in Burkina Faso
Ethnic groups in Guinea
Ethnic groups in Guinea-Bissau
Ethnic groups in Ivory Coast
Ethnic groups in Liberia
Ethnic groups in Mali
Ethnic groups in Mauritania
Ethnic groups in Senegal
Ethnic groups in Sierra Leone
Ethnic groups in the Gambia
Muslim communities in Africa
Muslim ethnoreligious groups in Africa
West African people